The Republic of Rotuma was an unrealized attempt at creating an independent Rotuma starting in September 1987 after the second Fijian coup. A part-Rotuman man named Henry Gibson announced to the New Zealand newspapers that he had declared the independence of Rotuma from Fiji. Gibson proclaimed himself the King of Rotuma and gained a popular following on the island. Aims to create the republic were aborted in 1988, when advocates were tried with sedition.

References

Former unrecognized countries
1987 in Fiji
1988 in Fiji
Fiji
Former countries in Oceania